Ruth Jepngetich (born ) is a Kenyan female volleyball player. She is part of the Kenya women's national volleyball team. On club level she played for Kenya Pipeline Company in 2014.

References

External links
 Profile at FIVB.org

1990 births
Living people
Kenyan women's volleyball players
Place of birth missing (living people)